Harry Sacksioni (born 23 October 1950, in Amsterdam) is a composer and guitar virtuoso of Dutch origin. The peak of his fame was during the 1970s to 1990s. Famous works of this period include Meta Sequoia, Vensters and Elixer, along with re-arrangements of existing pieces, such as Anji (Davy Graham), Scarborough Fair (arr. Paul Simon) and I Wish (Stevie Wonder). Sacksioni's work is mainly instrumental, although some tracks during the 1980s provided guitar accompaniments to vocals provided by himself and Raymond van het Groenewoud.

Sacksioni was one of the artists who recorded the song Shalom from Holland (written by Simon Hammelburg and Ron Klipstein) as a token of solidarity to the Israeli people, threatened by missiles from Iraq, during the first Gulf War in 1991.

Sacksioni's work is not commercially motivated, and as a result, he is not often featured in the mainstream media. His records appear under an independent, privately owned label Katowee (from cutaway, a feature of some guitars) as a protest against the high prices of CDs.

Sacksioni uses various guitars during a live concert. When touring, he chooses instruments from his collection of acoustic and electric guitars to suit the venue and programme. He plays both 6 and 12-string guitars, both acoustic and electric. An unusual guitar of his is a hand-built double guitar: one half is electric and the other half is acoustic.

Sacksioni has been living in Lienden, Netherlands, since the 1980s. Before that, he lived in Amsterdam.

Harry Sacksioni was made a Knight of the Order of Orange-Nassau, decorated by Klaas Tammes, mayor of the municipality of Buren, during a concert in the Agnietenhof in Tiel on 9 May 2009. On his 60th birthday, Harry was given a tribute concert by a number of musical colleagues in the famous Amsterdam venue Carré.

Major collaborations
Frank Boeijen
Raymond van het Groenewoud
Digmon Roovers
Herman van Veen
Erik van der Wurff
John May

Discography

Studio albums

Live albums

Compilations

Singles
Het dubbelleven van Holle Vijnman / Prikklok 07.45 uur (1979)
Herman van Veen, Erik van der Wurff & Harry Sacksioni (1981)
Suikerspin / Marco Polo (1981)
Nachtjournaal / Escapade (1984)
Je moet eerst vliegen / De telganger (1985)
Paddentrek / Yeti (1987)
Alter Ego / Bath Blues (1990)
Fuerteventura / Arena (1994)
The Killy Killy Song (1994)
Jessica / Masai Mara (1994)
Meta Sequoia / Axel F.: Toerist (1998)
De paddentrek (2008)

External links
Harry Sacksioni's official website

Listening
TV Gelderland: Harry Sacksioni in Stringdance, 2007
Rockin' Gelderland: Harry Sacksioni, 2007

1950 births
Living people
Dutch guitarists
Dutch male guitarists
Musicians from Amsterdam
Knights of the Order of Orange-Nassau